"Shine" is a song by American musician Trey Anastasio. It was released on October 11, 2005 as a single from the album of the same name. Credited to both Trey Anastasio and Brendan O'Brien, it was recorded in mid-2005 at the Southern Tracks Recording Studio in Atlanta, Georgia. Anastasio admits that "Shine" was written after all of the other tracks on the album, as a way to "tie it all together." It was debuted live on July 24, 2005, at the 10,000 Lakes Festival in Detroit Lakes, Minnesota.

"Shine" was Anastasio's most successful solo single on the Billboard Adult Alternative Songs chart, where it reached #4 in December 2005.

Personnel 
 Guitar, vocals - Trey Anastasio
 Drums - Kenny Aronoff
 Bass, keyboards, backing vocals - Brendan O'Brien
 Percussion - Cyro Baptista
 Cover photos - Phil Knott

References

External links
 "Shine" Tablature
 Trey Anastasio's Official Website

Trey Anastasio songs
2005 songs
Song recordings produced by Brendan O'Brien (record producer)
Columbia Records singles
Songs written by Trey Anastasio